The Duchess of Malfi is an adaptation by the twentieth-century German dramatist Bertolt Brecht of the English seventeenth-century tragedy by John Webster. He collaborated with H. R. Hays and Anglo-American poet, W. H. Auden.  It was written during Brecht's period of exile in the United States. In premiered in New York, in 1946.

References

Plays by Bertolt Brecht
1943 plays